Procambarus pygmaeus, commonly known as the Christmas tree crayfish, is a species of crayfish in the family Cambaridae. It is endemic to the south-eastern United States.

References 

Cambaridae
Endemic fauna of the United States
Freshwater crustaceans of North America
Crustaceans described in 1942
Taxa named by Horton H. Hobbs Jr.